The Black Hole of Calcutta was a dungeon in Fort William, Calcutta, measuring , in which troops of Siraj-ud-Daulah, the Nawab of Bengal, held British prisoners of war on the night of 20 June 1756. John Zephaniah Holwell, one of the British prisoners and an employee of the East India Company, said that, after the fall of Fort William, the surviving British soldiers, Indian sepoys, and Indian civilians were imprisoned overnight in conditions so cramped that many people died from suffocation and heat exhaustion, and that 123 of 146 prisoners of war imprisoned there died.  Some modern historians believe that 64 prisoners were sent into the Hole, and that 43 died there. Some historians put the figure even lower, to about 18 dead, while questioning the veracity of Holwell's account itself.

Background

Fort William was established to protect the East India Company's trade in the city of Calcutta, the principal city of the Bengal Presidency. In 1756 India, there existed the possibility of a battle with the military forces of the French East India Company, so the British reinforced the fort. Siraj ud-Daulah ordered the fortification construction to be stopped by the French and British, and the French complied while the British demurred.

In consequence to that British indifference to his authority, Siraj ud-Daulah organised his army and laid siege to Fort William. In an effort to survive the battle, the British commander ordered the surviving soldiers of the garrison to escape, yet left behind 146 soldiers under the civilian command of John Zephaniah Holwell, a senior bureaucrat of the East India Company, who had been a military surgeon in earlier life.

The desertions of Indian sepoys made the British defence of Fort William ineffective and it fell to the siege of Bengali forces on 20 June 1756. The surviving defenders who were captured and made prisoners of war numbered between 64 and 69, along with an unknown number of Anglo-Indian soldiers and civilians who earlier had been sheltered in Fort William. The British officers and merchants based in Kolkata were rounded up by the forces loyal to Siraj ud-Daulah and forced into a dungeon known as the "Black Hole".

The Holwell account

Holwell wrote about the events that occurred after the fall of Fort William. He met with Siraj-ud-Daulah, who assured him: "On the word of a soldier; that no harm should come to us".

Historians offer different numbers of prisoners and casualties of war; Stanley Wolpert estimated that 64 people were imprisoned and 21 survived. D. L. Prior estimated that 43 men of the Fort-William garrison were either missing or dead, for reasons other than suffocation and shock. Busteed suggests that the many non-combatants present in the fort when it was captured make infeasible a precise number of people killed. Regarding responsibility for the maltreatment and the deaths in the Black Hole of Calcutta,  Holwell said, "it was the result of revenge and resentment, in the breasts of the lower Jemadars (sergeants), to whose custody we were delivered, for the number of their order killed during the siege."

Concurring with Holwell, Wolpert said that Siraj-ud-Daulah did not order the imprisonment and was not informed of it. The physical description of the Black Hole of Calcutta corresponds with Holwell's point of view:

Afterward, when the prison of Fort William was opened, the corpses of the dead men were thrown into a ditch. As prisoners-of-war, Holwell and three other men were transferred to Murshidabad.

Imperial aftermath
The remaining survivors of the Black Hole of Calcutta were freed the next morning on the orders of the Nawab, who learned only that morning of their sufferings. After news of Calcutta's capture was received by the British in Madras in August 1756, Lieutenant Colonel Robert Clive was sent to retaliate against the Nawab. With his troops and local Indian allies, Clive recaptured Calcutta in January 1757, and defeated Siraj ud-Daulah at the Battle of Plassey, which resulted in Siraj being overthrown as Nawab of Bengal and executed.

The Black Hole of Calcutta was later used as a warehouse.

Monument to the victims

In memoriam of the dead, the British erected a 15-metre (50') high obelisk; it now is in the graveyard of (Anglican) St. John's Church, Calcutta. Holwell had erected a tablet on the site of the 'Black Hole' to commemorate the victims but, at some point (the precise date is uncertain), it disappeared. Lord Curzon, on becoming Viceroy in 1899, noticed that there was nothing to mark the spot and commissioned a new monument, mentioning the prior existence of Holwell's; it was erected in 1901 at the corner of Dalhousie Square (now B. B. D. Bagh), which is said to be the site of the 'Black Hole'. At the apex of the Indian independence movement, the presence of this monument in Calcutta was turned into a nationalist cause célèbre. Nationalist leaders, including Subhas Chandra Bose, lobbied energetically for its removal. The Congress and the Muslim League joined forces in the anti-monument movement. As a result, Abdul Wasek Mia of Nawabganj thana, a student leader of that time, led the removal of the monument from Dalhousie Square in July 1940. The monument was re-erected in the graveyard of St John's Church in Calcutta, where it remains.

The 'Black Hole' itself, being merely the guardroom in the old Fort William, disappeared shortly after the incident when the fort itself was taken down to be replaced by the new Fort William which still stands today in the Maidan to the south of B.B.D. Bagh. The precise location of that guardroom is in an alleyway between the General Post Office and the adjacent building to the north, in the north west corner of B.B.D. Bagh. The memorial tablet which was once on the wall of that building beside the GPO can now be found in the nearby postal museum.

"List of the smothered in the Black Hole prison exclusive of sixty-nine, consisting of Dutch and British sergeants, corporals, soldiers, topazes, militia, whites, and Portuguese, (whose names I am unacquainted with), making on the whole one hundred and twenty-three persons."

Holwell's list of the victims of the Black Hole of Calcutta:

In popular culture

Literature
Muriel Rukeyser, in The Book of the Dead, originally published as a group of poems in U.S. 1: Poems (1938), quotes from Vito Marcantonio's speech "Dusty Death" (1936). Rukeyser was writing about the Hawk's Nest Tunnel tragedy and referenced to Marcantonio's speech to compare the silicate tunnels to the Black Holes of Calcutta, writing "This is the place. Away from this my life I am indeed Adam unparadiz'd. Some fools call this the Black Hole of Calcutta. I don't know how they ever get to Congress."

Thomas Pynchon refers to the Black Hole of Calcutta in the historical novel Mason & Dixon (1997). The character Charles Mason spends much time on Saint Helena with the astronomer Nevil Maskelyne, the brother-in-law of Lord Robert Clive of India. Later in the story, Jeremiah Dixon visits New York City, and attends a secret "Broad-Way" production of the "musical drama", The Black Hole of Calcutta, or, the Peevish Wazir, "executed with such a fine respect for detail ...". Kenneth Tynan satirically refers to it in the long-running musical revue Oh! Calcutta!, which was played on Broadway for more than 7,000 performances. Edgar Allan Poe makes reference to the "stifling" of the prisoners in the introduction to "The Premature Burial" (1844). The Black Hole is mentioned in Looking Backward (1888) by Edward Bellamy as an example of the depravity of the past.

In a story written by Indian author Masti Venkatesha Iyengar, "Rangana Maduve" ("Ranga's Marriage"), the narrator Shyama describes Ranga's house as 'the Black Hole of Calcutta' because of the large crowd that had gathered to see Ranga when he came home after completing his studies. If all the people had gone inside, the house would have become as crowded as the Black Hole of Calcutta.

In the science-fiction novel Omega: The Last Days of the World (1894), by Camille Flammarion, the Black Hole of Calcutta is mentioned for the suffocating properties of Carbonic-Oxide (Carbon Monoxide) upon the British soldiers imprisoned in that dungeon. Eugene O'Neill, in Long Day's Journey into Night, Act 4, Jamie says, "Can't expect us to live in the Black Hole of Calcutta." Patrick O'Brian in The Mauritius Command (1977) compared Jack Aubrey's house to the black hole of Calcutta "except that whereas the Hole was hot, dry, and airless", Aubrey's cottage "let in draughts from all sides".

In Chapter VII of Pearl S. Buck’s biography of her father, Fighting Angel (1936), she compares the brutality of China’s 1899-1901 Boxer Rebellion (which she and her family survived while living in China) to that of the Black Hole of Calcutta: "The story of the Boxer Rebellion ... remains, like the tale of the Black Hole of Calcutta, one of the festering spots of history. If the number of people actually dead was small, as such numbers go in these days of wholesale death by accidents and wars, it was the manner of death ....that makes the heart shudder and condemn even while the mind can reason and weigh."

Diana Gabaldon mentions briefly the incident in her novel Lord John and the Private Matter (2003). The Black Hole is also compared with the evil miasma of Calcutta as a whole in Dan Simmons's novel The Song of Kali. Stephen King makes a reference to the Black Hole of Calcutta in his 1983 novel Christine, and his 2004 novel Song of Susannah.

In Chapter V of King Solomon's Mines by H. Rider Haggard (1885) the Black Hole of Calcutta is mentioned: "This gave us some slight shelter from the burning rays of the sun, but the atmosphere in that amateur grave can be better imagined than described. The Black Hole of Calcutta must have been a fool to it". In John Fante's novel The Road to Los Angeles (1985), the main character Arturo Bandini recalls when seeing his place of work: "I thought about the Black Hole of Calcutta." In Vanity Fair, William Makepeace Thackeray makes a reference to the Black Hole of Calcutta when describing the Anglo-Indian district in London (Chapter LX). Swami Vivekananda makes a mention of the Black Hole of Calcutta in connection with describing Holwell's journey to Murshidabad.

When discussing deep unconsciousness in her book How to be Human, Ruby Wax describes this as: "It's like the black hole of Calcutta of our souls."

In Hellblazer: Event Horizon, John Constantine says that a mad Brahmin in the Black Hole made a stone because he wanted revenge. The stone causes one to have insane thoughts and hallucinations.

In The Other Side of Morning by Stephen Goss (2022), the events of the Black Hole of Calcutta are described from the perspective of John Holwell.  The book is the story of Holwell's life leading up to the incident.

Television
In the period drama Turn: Washington's Spies, the character of John Graves Simcoe claims in Season 4 that he was born in India and that his father died in the Black Hole of Calcutta after being tortured. (In historical reality, Simcoe was born in England and his father died of pneumonia.)

In an episode of the British sitcom Open All Hours Arkwright orders his assistant and nephew Granville to clean the outside window ledge. He attempts to say "There's enough dirt there to fill the Black Hole of Calcutta", but his extensive stuttering when trying to say 'Calcutta' causes him to change it to "There's enough dirt there to fill the Hanging Gardens of Babylon".

In an episode of British sitcom Only Fools and Horses, while discussing Uncle Albert's history of falling down numerous holes, Del Boy infers that the only hole Albert has not fallen down is "the black one in Calcutta".

In an episode of The Andy Griffith Show, S. 6 Ep. 11 "The Cannon", Deputy Warren is placed in charge of security at the Mayberry Founders Day ceremony and he becomes obsessed with the town decorative cannon. He peers into the fuse breach and claims "It is darker than the Hole of Calcutta in there".

In an episode of The L Word, Alice refers to the bad vibes in the coffee shop as "The Black Hole of Calcutta".

In an episode of British television series Yes, Minister, the permanent secretary refers to a packed train compartment as the Black Hole of Calcutta.

In an episode of Have Gun, Will Travel, S. 2 Ep. 10 "The Lady", Paladin warns a British woman of the danger of an imminent Comanche attack by reminding her of indigenous reprisals in India, including "the Khyber Pass, the Sepoy Mutiny, and the Black Hole of Calcutta".

In an episode of the British comedy Peep Show, the character Mark says "The more, the merrier, they said as another poor soul was crammed into the Black Hole of Calcutta."

Film
The Black Hole of Calcutta is referenced early in the film Albert R.N., a 1953 British film dealing with a German prisoner-of-war camp for allied naval officers.

In the 1963 episode of Steptoe and Son entitled ‘The Bath’, when Harold Steptoe displaces his father from his bedroom in order to install a bathroom, Albert Steptoe angrily describes his new ‘bedroom’ - the cupboard under the stairs - as being “…like the Black 'Ole of Calcutta!”

There's also a reference in the 1987 film Hiding Out, where the protagonist's aunt criticizes her teenage son's messy room by comparing it to the Black Hole.

It is also referenced in the 1991 film The Addams Family as one of the locations visited by Gomez and Morticia Addams during their second honeymoon.

Astronomy
According to Hong-Yee Chiu, an astrophysicist at NASA, the Black Hole of Calcutta was the inspiration for the term black hole referring to objects resulting from the gravitational collapse of very heavy stars. He recalled hearing physicist Robert Dicke in the early 1960s compare such gravitationally collapsed objects to the prison.

Prison reform 
A minority opinion in the August 1910 report of the Penitentiary Investigating Committee of the State of Texas (USA) referred to the prison conditions in this way:

See also
Human rights violation
Hỏa Lò Prison

Notes

References
 Noel Barber. ‘’The Black Hole of Calcutta: A Reconstruction,’’ London, Suttonn Publishing Ltd.,U.K. Edition, 2003.  272 p. .
 Partha Chatterjee. The Black Hole of Empire: History of a Global Practice of Power. Princeton, N.J.: Princeton University Press,  2012. 425p. . Explores the incident itself and the history of using it to expand or critique British rule in India.
 Urs App (2010). The Birth of Orientalism. Philadelphia: University of Pennsylvania Press; contains a 66-page chapter (pp. 297–362) on Holwell.

External links

The Black Hole of Calcutta & The End of Islamic Power in India (1756—1757)
 The Black Hole of Empire – Stanford Presidential Lecture by Partha Chatterjee
 Photo of Calcutta Black Hole Memorial at St. John's Church Complex, Calcutta
 Partha Chatterjee and Ayça Çubukçu, "Empire as a Practice of Power: Introduction," The Asia-Pacific Journal, Vol 10, Issue 41, No. 1, 9 October 2012.  Interview with Chatterjee.
 
The Black Hole of Calcutta—-the Fort William's airtight death prison
 "A genuine narrative of the sufferings of the persons who were confined in the prison called the Black Hole, in Fort William at Calcutta, in the kingdom of Bengal, after the surrender of that place to the Indians in June 1756, from a letter of J. Z. Holwell, Esq. to William Davis, Esq.", The Annual Register, 1758

1756 in British India
18th century in Kolkata
Buildings and structures in Kolkata
Prisoner of war massacres
Massacres in India
Massacres in 1756
Mass murder in 1756
1756 murders in Asia
18th-century murders in India